Niphargus stenopus is a species of freshwater amphipod crustacean which is endemic to Slovenia.

References

External links
 Niphargus Webpage – University of Ljubljana

Niphargidae
Crustaceans described in 1960
Endemic arthropods of Slovenia
Taxonomy articles created by Polbot